The 2015 Open Engie Saint-Gaudens Midi-Pyrénées was a professional tennis tournament played on outdoor clay courts. It was the nineteenth edition of the tournament and part of the 2015 ITF Women's Circuit, offering a total of $50,000+H in prize money. It took place in Saint-Gaudens, France, on 11–17 May 2015.

Singles main draw entrants

Seeds 

 1 Rankings as of 4 May 2015

Other entrants 
The following players received wildcards into the singles main draw:
  Tessah Andrianjafitrimo
  Amandine Hesse
  Irina Ramialison
  Marta Sirotkina

The following players received entry from the qualifying draw:
  Verónica Cepede Royg
  Fiona Ferro
  Nicole Melichar
  Olivia Rogowska

The following players received entry by a lucky loser spot:
  Akgul Amanmuradova
  Donna Vekić

Champions

Singles

 María Teresa Torró Flor def.  Jana Čepelová, 6–1, 6–0

Doubles

 Mariana Duque  /  Julia Glushko def.  Beatriz Haddad Maia /  Nicole Melichar, 1–6, 7–6(7–5), [10–4]

External links 
 2015 Open Engie Saint-Gaudens Midi-Pyrénées at ITFtennis.com
 Official website 

2015 ITF Women's Circuit
Engie
2015 in French tennis